WaveAid was a fund raising concert held on Saturday, 29 January 2005, as a means for raising funds for the victims of the 2004 Indian Ocean earthquake, known as the Boxing Day tsunami.  It was held at the Sydney Cricket Ground and broadcast on television by Channel [V] and MTV, and on radio by Triple J, Triple M, NOVA and World Audio Radio 2. The event was organised by Michael Chugg, Joe Segreto of IMC/Homebake Festival and Mark Pope.

Part of the between-band entertainment was the screens to the side of the stage showing live feeds of audience members with captions including important messaging pertaining to the catastrophic results of the tsunami and methods which those in attendance and watching on TV could donate.

Funds raised
The event was mainly organised by the Australian music industry spearheaded by Michael Chugg, Joe Segreto of IMC/Homebake Festival and Mark Pope.  They aimed to keep the overhead costs as low as possible so that as much profit as possible would go the affiliated charities.  Almost all of these costs were waived or heavily discounted.  The organisers estimated that if this had been an ordinary festival, these costs would have been around $3,527,908.  WaveAid ended up costing $596,727 to stage.

The money raised from donations and ticket sales came to $2,896,727, meaning that the total money raised was exactly $2,300,000.

Affiliated charities
UNICEF
CARE Australia
Red Cross Australia
Oxfam Australia
Community Aid Abroad

Performers, MCs & selected songs
The Waifs
Missy Higgins - Scar.
Nick Cave - Red Right Hand, The Ship Song, Jack the Ripper.
Kasey Chambers - Not Pretty Enough, Barricades & Brick Walls, Pony.
Pete Murray - Feeler, So Beautiful.
Finn Brothers - Weather With You, Don't Dream It's Over, World Where You Live, Won’t Give In, Throw Your Arms Around Me, I Got You.
The Wrights - Evie - Parts 1, 2 & 3
Michael Chugg - MC
King’s Own Scottish Borderers - Mist Covered Mountain.
John Butler Trio - Peaches & Cream, Treat Yo’ Mama, Hello, Betterman, Zebra.
Silverchair - Israel's Son, Emotion Sickness, Without You, Greatest View, Ana's Song (Open Fire), The Door, The Lever.
Adam Spencer - MC
Powderfinger - Bless My Soul, My Happiness, Passenger, These Days, Love Your Way, Like a Dog, On My Mind.
Midnight Oil - Read About It, The Power and the Passion, King of the Mountain, Say Your Prayers, Beds Are Burning, The Dead Heart, Forgotten Years, Best of Both Worlds.

DVD release
The concert was released as a DVD with selected performances from all of the groups. The DVD also featured a 17-minute documentary "Making Waveaid Happen", which includes interviews with artists, press conference footage and interviews with event organisers and promoters. The DVD donates a portion of its earnings to the WaveAid charity also.
 "London Still" - The Waifs
 "Lighthouse" - The Waifs
 "Crazy Train" - The Waifs
 "This Is How It Goes" - Missy Higgins
 "Casualty" - Missy Higgins
 "Scar" - Missy Higgins
 "The Ship Song" - Nick Cave
 "Barricades and Brickwalls" - Kasey Chambers
 "Pony" - Kasey Chambers
 "Not Pretty Enough" - Kasey Chambers
 "Fall Your Way" - Pete Murray
 "Lines" - Pete Murray
 "Feeler" - Pete Murray
 "Weather With You" - Finn Brothers
 "Won’t Give In" - Finn Brothers
 "Throw Your Arms" - Finn Brothers
 "Evie Pt 1 - Let Your Hair Hang Down" - The Wrights Feat. Nic Cester
 "Evie Pt 2 - Evie" - The Wrights Feat. Bernard Fanning
 "Evie Pt 3 - I’m Losing You" - The Wrights Feat. Phil Jamieson
 "Peaches and Cream" - John Butler Trio
 "Treat Yo Mama" - John Butler Trio
 "Hello" - John Butler Trio
 "Betterman" - John Butler Trio
 "Zebra" - John Butler Trio
 "Israel's Son" - Silverchair
 "Without You" - Silverchair
 "Ana's Song (Open Fire)" - Silverchair
 "The Greatest View" - Silverchair
 "The Door" - Silverchair
 "Bless My Soul" - Powderfinger
 "My Happiness" - Powderfinger
 "Passenger" - Powderfinger
 "These Days" - Powderfinger
 "On My Mind" - Powderfinger
 "Read About It" - Midnight Oil
 "The Power and the Passion" - Midnight Oil
 "Say Your Prayers" - Midnight Oil
 "Beds Are Burning" - Midnight Oil
 "The Dead Heart" - Midnight Oil
 "Forgotten Years" - Midnight Oil
 "Best of Both Worlds" - Midnight Oil

Certifications

Awards and nominations

Helpmann Awards
The Helpmann Awards is an awards show, celebrating live entertainment and performing arts in Australia, presented by industry group Live Performance Australia since 2001. Note: 2020 and 2021 were cancelled due to the COVID-19 pandemic.
 

! 
|-
|rowspan="2" | 2005
| Midnight Oil in WaveAid - the Tsunami Relief Concert 
| Helpmann Award for Best Performance in an Australian Contemporary Concert
| 
| rowspan="2" | 
|-
| WaveAid - the Tsunami Relief Concert
| Helpmann Award for Best Special Event
| 
|-

References

Music festivals in Australia
Benefit concerts in Australia
Music festivals established in 2005